Kshitij Thakur  is an Indian politician. He currently holds the office of Member of Legislative Assembly for the constituency of Nala Sopara in the state of Maharashtra, India. He is the son of Hitendra Thakur, four times MLA from Vasai. He belongs to the Bahujan Vikas Aghadi party which has a strong base in the region of Vasai and Virar in Palghar (formerly part of Thane) district of Maharashtra.

Thakur was suspended from the Maharashtra Legislative Assembly from 20 March 2013 to 31 December 2013 for beating up a policeman inside the premises of the state assembly. He was married on 29 January 2012 in Virar.

Thakur has been awarded for his contribution as a Young and Dynamic Philanthropist in year 2019.

Early life and education
Kshitij Thakur was born on July 10, 1983 in Virar area of Palghar district, Maharashtra, India to politician and Vasai MLA Hitendra Thakur. His political party, Bahujan Vikas Aghadi, of which Hitendra Thakur is the president, currently holds majority in the Vasai Virar City Municipal Corporation (VVCMC), Vasai Taluka Panchayat Samiti and various Gram Panchayats in the region.

Political career

Early Political Career  
Kshitij Thakur's father, Hitendra Thakur was the M.L.A. of the region for four consecutive terms, the first as a candidate of the Indian National Congress and the next three as an independent candidate. Thakur began his political career in 2009. The Vasai constituency was split into two—Vasai and Nallasopara. He contested from the Nallasopara constituency from the Bahujan Vikas Aghadi, led by his father Hitendra Thakur. At the age of 26, he was elected with a margin of more than 40,000 votes. His opponents, Shiv Sena and Maharashtra Navanirman Sena, received second and third highest votes respectively. The feat made him one of the youngest members of the Maharashtra Legislative Assembly.

Vidhan Sabha Elections
In the 2009 Maharashtra state assembly elections, Hitendra Thakur stepped down voluntarily to make way for his son to enter Indian politics. After delimitation, the Vasai constituency was divided into Vasai and Nala Sopara. Kshitij Hitendra Thakur is one of the youngest members of the Maharashtra Legislative Assembly. In his first election Kshitij Thakur won with a margin of more than 40,000 votes. He got 89,284 votes, while his opposition Shiv Sena candidate Shirish Chavan got 48,502 votes. MNS aspirant Vivek Keluskar got 20,749 votes. In 2014, he defeated the BJP's Rajan Balkrishna Naik, who got only 59,067 votes as against Thakur’s 1,13,566 votes. Thakur had won the 2014 elections by a margin of 54,499 votes.

Assets and Liabilities

According to his election affidavit filed with the State Election Commission for the 2014 Maharashtra Assembly Elections, his total assets were worth  and his liabilities ran into .

References

Living people
Bahujan Vikas Aghadi politicians
Marathi politicians
Maharashtra MLAs 2009–2014
Politics of Thane district
Maharashtra MLAs 2014–2019
Harvard Business School alumni
Baldwin Wallace University alumni
Maharashtra MLAs 2019–2024
1983 births